István Thomán (4 November 186222 September 1940) was a Hungarian piano virtuoso and music educator. He was a notable piano teacher, with students including Béla Bartók, Ernő Dohnányi, Paul de Marky who later taught Oscar Peterson in Quebec, Gisela Selden-Goth, and Georges Cziffra. His six-volume Technique of Piano Playing is still in use today.

Early life and education
Thomán was born in Homonna, Zemplén County, Kingdom of Hungary (now in Slovakia) in 1862 to Jewish parents, Dr. David Thomán and Rosa Weisberger. Recognised for his talent, he became a favorite student of Franz Liszt. Liszt appointed him to teach at the Royal Hungarian Academy of Music in Budapest, but had to retire suddenly at the age of 45.

Career
Thomán toured with Liszt, was present at his death and was a pallbearer at his funeral. Thomán, along with fellow Liszt student Árpád Szendy, were important in carrying on the Liszt style through their teaching at the Royal Hungarian Academy of Music.

As a teacher at the Royal Academy, Thomán took on a 17-year-old Ernő Dohnányi as a student in 1894. In 1903, a 21-year-old Béla Bartók dedicated his Study for the Left Hand to Thomán. The study is a Sonata performed entirely with one hand. In his Studies on Chopin's Études Leopold Godowsky dedicated Opus 25 No. 11 (A minor) to Thomán.

Thomán's daughter, Mária Thomán (1899–1948), became a noted concert violinist and studied with Jenő Hubay, Franz von Vecsey, Carl Flesch and Alma Moodie. She gave concerts throughout Europe, both as a soloist and in the accompaniment of philharmonic orchestras and chamber ensembles.

References 

1862 births
1940 deaths
19th-century Hungarian people
20th-century Hungarian people
Hungarian classical pianists
Hungarian male musicians
Hungarian Jews
Male classical pianists
Jewish classical musicians
Piano pedagogues
Academic staff of the Franz Liszt Academy of Music
People from Humenné
Pupils of Franz Liszt